Atranorin is a chemical substance produced by some species of lichen. It is a secondary metabolite belonging to a group of compounds known as depsides. Atranorin has analgesic, anti-inflammatory, antibacterial, antifungal, cytotoxic, antioxidant, antiviral, and immunomodulatory properties. In rare cases, people can react allergic to atranorin.

References

Further reading 

 
 
 
 

Polyphenols
Lichen products